Island County is a county located in the U.S. state of Washington. As of the 2020 census, its population was 86,857. Its county seat is Coupeville, while its largest city is Oak Harbor.

The county's name reflects the fact that it is composed entirely of islands. It contains two large islands, Whidbey and Camano, and seven smaller islands (Baby, Ben Ure, Deception, Kalamut, Minor, Smith, and Strawberry). Island County was created out of Thurston County on December 22, 1852, by the legislature of Oregon Territory, and is the eighth-oldest county in Washington. It originally encompassed what are now Snohomish, Skagit, Whatcom, and San Juan Counties.

Island County comprises the Oak Harbor, Washington Micropolitan Statistical Area, which is also included in the Seattle–Tacoma, WA Combined Statistical Area.

Geography
It is the second smallest county in Washington by land area after San Juan, and second smallest by total area after Wahkiakum.

Geographic features
Puget Sound
Strait of Juan de Fuca
Whidbey Island
Camano Island
Saratoga Passage

National protected areas
 Pacific Northwest National Scenic Trail (part)
 Ebey's Landing National Historical Reserve

Demographics

2000 census
As of the census of 2000, there were 71,558 people, 27,784 households, and 20,254 families living in the county. The population density was 343 people per square mile (133/km2).  There were 32,378 housing units at an average density of 155 per square mile (60/km2).  The racial makeup of the county was 87.2% White, 2.4% Black or African American, 1.0% Native American, 4.2% Asian, 0.4% Pacific Islander, 1.4% from other races, and 3.4% from two or more races. 4.0% of the population were Hispanic or Latino of any race. 16.2% were of German, 11.2% English, 9.9% Irish, 7.2% United States or American and 6.0% Norwegian ancestry. 92.5% spoke English, 2.5% Spanish and 2.2% Tagalog as their first language.

There were 27,784 households, out of which 33.3% had children under the age of 18 living with them, 62.2% were married couples living together, 7.8% had a female householder with no husband present, and 27.1% were non-families. 21.5% of all households were made up of individuals, and 8.3% had someone living alone who was 65 years of age or older.  The average household size was 2.52 and the average family size was 2.93.

In the county, the population was spread out, with 25.5% under the age of 18, 8.5% from 18 to 24, 28.00% from 25 to 44, 23.7% from 45 to 64, and 14.3% who were 65 years of age or older.  The median age was 37 years. For every 100 females, there were 100.4 males.  For every 100 females age 18 and over, there were 97.9 males.

The median income for a household in the county was $45,513, and the median income for a family was $51,363. Males had a median income of $35,331 versus $25,612 for females. The per capita income for the county was $21,472.  About 5.1% of families and 7.0% of the population were below the poverty line, including 8.8% of those under age 18 and 4.4% of those age 65 or over.

2010 census
As of the 2010 census, there were 78,506 people, 32,746 households, and 22,156 families living in the county. The racial makeup of the county was 86.1% white, 4.4% Asian, 2.2% black or African American, 0.8% American Indian, 0.5% Pacific islander, 1.5% from other races, and 4.5% from two or more races. Those of Hispanic or Latino origin made up 5.5% of the population. The largest ancestry groups were:

21.4% German
14.3% Irish
14.0% English
6.1% Norwegian
4.5% Scottish
4.3% French
4.1% Dutch
4.0% Swedish
4.0% American
3.6% Mexican
3.5% Italian
2.9% Filipino
2.5% Scotch-Irish
2.1% Polish
1.6% Welsh
1.5% Danish

Of the 32,746 households, 27.3% had children under the age of 18 living with them, 56.6% were married couples living together, 7.9% had a female householder with no husband present, 32.3% were non-families, and 25.9% of all households were made up of individuals. The average household size was 2.35 and the average family size was 2.81. The median age was 43.2 years.

The median income for a household in the county was $57,190 and the median income for a family was $68,106. Males had a median income of $46,801 versus $35,189 for females. The per capita income for the county was $29,079. About 5.7% of families and 8.0% of the population were below the poverty line, including 12.1% of those under age 18 and 4.0% of those age 65 or over.

Transportation
The primary islands of Island County, Whidbey Island and Camano Island are served by a total of 3 Washington State Routes, those being SR 20 and SR 525 on Whidbey Island, and SR 532 on Camano Island.  SR 20 enters Island County via the Port Townsend-Coupeville (Keystone) ferry route from the West, and departs via the Deception Pass Bridge in the North.  SR 525 enters Island County from the East/South via the Mukilteo-Clinton ferry and terminates at an intersection with SR 20, South of Coupeville. SR 532 begins on Camano Island at Terry's Corner and departs Island County to the East via the Camano Gateway Bridge.

These islands are also served by a fare-free/pre-paid bus service called Island Transit.

Politics
Island County is divided in many ways between its north and south. While the north (Oak Harbor) is conservative – Donald Trump received almost 55 percent of the 2016 vote and carried most precincts – most southern and central precincts voted for Hillary Clinton.

The south-central area (Coupeville, Langley) voted over 50 percent for Clinton, just over 30 percent for Trump.

Communities

Cities
Langley
Oak Harbor

Town
Coupeville (county seat)

Census-designated places
Camano
Clinton
Freeland
Whidbey Island Station, formerly listed as Ault Field

Other unincorporated communities

Austin
Baby Island Heights
Bayview
Bells Beach
Beverly Beach
Bretland
Camp Diana
Columbia Beach
Cornet
Glendale
Greenbank
Juniper Beach
Keystone
Lagoon Point
Long Beach
Mabana
Maxwelton
Midvale Corner
Northgate Terrace
Pebble Beach
Penn Cove Park
Pioneer Blueberries
Possession
Rodena Beach
San De Fuca
Sandy Hook
Saratoga
Sheliegh Estates
Smith Prairie
Sunlight Beach
Sunny Shore Acres
Tyee Beach
Utsalady

Juniper Beach, a wedding ceremony locale in past years, has given its name to the Juniper Beach Water District.

See also
National Register of Historic Places listings in Island County, Washington

References

External links

 
Seattle metropolitan area
1852 establishments in Oregon Territory
Populated places established in 1852
Western Washington